Mireille Enos (born September 22, 1975) is an American actress. Drawn to acting from a young age, she graduated in performing arts from Brigham Young University, where she was awarded the Irene Ryan Acting Scholarship. Having made her acting debut in the 1994 television film Without Consent, she has since received nominations for a Tony Award, a Golden Globe Award, and an Emmy Award.

Early in her career, Enos appeared variously as a guest star on such television shows as Sex and the City and The Education of Max Bickford among others. She made her feature film debut with a minor part in the 2001 romantic comedy Someone Like You, but garnered wider attention for her role as Honey in the 2005 Broadway production of Who's Afraid of Virginia Woolf?. Her performance in the latter earned her a nomination for Best Featured Actress at the Tony Awards. She again ventured into television roles and landed the role of twins Kathy and JoDean Marquart in the HBO drama series Big Love.

Enos' breakout role was on the AMC crime drama series The Killing; she played Sarah Linden, a Seattle-based police officer for the show's four seasons from 2011 to 2014. Her performance garnered her critical acclaim and earned her nominations for Outstanding Lead Actress in a Drama Series at the Primetime Emmy Award and the Golden Globe Award. Enos starred as Karin Lane in the 2013 disaster film World War Z and Kathleen Hall in the 2014 romantic drama If I Stay; both of the films were blockbuster productions. She continued to draw praise for her work in independent films like Never Here (2017). Enos starred as the  lead character in the short-lived ABC legal thriller The Catch.  In 2019, she appeared in the Amazon/BBC co-production of Good Omens as Carmine "Red" Zuigiber, a war correspondent who is actually War, one of the Four Horsemen of the Apocalypse. In 2019, she appeared as Marissa Wiegler in action drama streaming television series Hanna, based on the 2011 film of the same name, on Amazon Prime Video.

Early life
Enos was born on September 22, 1975, the daughter of Monique, a French teacher, and Jon Goree Enos. Her father was American, from Texas, and her mother was French. She is the fourth of five children, all of whom work in the arts industry in some capacity. Her brothers are Jongiorgi and Raphael, and sisters are Veronique and Ginger. Her younger sister, Ginger, is a modern dancer.

Her family moved to Houston, Texas when Enos was five years old. There, she attended the High School for the Performing and Visual Arts. Enos studied theater at Brigham Young University, graduating with a bachelor of arts in acting in 1997. While a student, she won the Irene Ryan Award at the Kennedy Center in Washington, D.C., an award annually presented to the nation's top collegiate actor.

Career

1994–2010
Enos made her screen acting debut in the television film Without Consent (1994). She made her feature film debut with small role in the romantic comedy Someone Like You (2001) starring Ashley Judd. On television she had number of guest-starring parts in numerous shows, including Sex and the City, Strong Medicine, Rescue Me, Without a Trace, Crossing Jordan, CSI: Miami, Medium and Law & Order: Criminal Intent.

She also appeared in several stage productions. She played Perdita in the 2002 Shakespeare Theatre Company production of The Winter's Tale at the Lansburgh Theater in Washington, DC. She appeared in the 2005 Broadway revival production of Who's Afraid of Virginia Woolf?, which starred Kathleen Turner and Bill Irwin. For her performance she received a Tony Award nomination for Best Featured Actress in a Play.

In 2007, Enos joined the cast of the HBO drama series Big Love about a polygamous family. She played the roles of twin sisters JoDean Marquart and Kathy Marquart. She was a regular cast member in the third and fourth seasons.

2011–present
In 2010, Enos was cast in her first lead role in a television series: detective Sarah Linden in the AMC drama series The Killing, based upon the Danish television series Forbrydelsen. She received critical acclaim for that performance, and the first season was praised by most critics. Tim Goodman of The Hollywood Reporter in his review said "It's not until you watch Enos play Sarah for a while that it sinks in—there hasn't been a female American character like her probably ever."

Enos received nominations for an Primetime Emmy Award for Outstanding Lead Actress in a Drama Series, Golden Globe Award for Best Actress – Television Series Drama, and three Saturn Award for Best Actress on Television. The series ended in 2014, after four seasons.

After her breakout role in The Killing, Enos began her career in feature films. She played Karin Lane, the wife of Brad Pitt's character in World War Z (2013). The film received positive reviews and was a commercial success, grossing over $540 million. Also in 2013, she co-starred as Josh Brolin's character's wife in Gangster Squad, and appeared opposite Reese Witherspoon in the crime drama Devil's Knot, based on a true story, the West Memphis Three. In 2014, she appeared in the crime thriller Sabotage directed by David Ayer and later starred in drama film If I Stay directed by R. J. Cutler, based on the novel of the same name by Gayle Forman.

The film was released on August 22, 2014. Enos co-starred later that year alongside Ryan Reynolds in The Captive, directed by Atom Egoyan. Enos was cast as lead actress in the thriller Never Here, which was directed by Camille Thoman.

In March 2015, it was announced that Enos had been cast as the lead character in the ABC legal drama series, The Catch, produced by Shonda Rhimes. She plays the lead character Alice Vaughan, the head of a very high-end private detective agency in this "humorous" thriller, which aired its first 10-episode season in spring 2016, and a second season of 10 episodes in 2017 as part of ABC's "TGIT" Thursday-night lineup.

Also in March 2015, it was announced Enos would star alongside Olivia Cooke in Katie Says Goodbye, an independent film. That same year, she starred in Behold My Heart, directed by Joshua Leonard. In 2019, she appears as Marissa Wiegler, a role originated by Cate Blanchett in action drama streaming television series Hanna, based on the 2011 film of the same name, on Amazon Prime Video.

In August 2020, it was announced the 2018 film The Lie (her reunion with The Killing's Veena Sud) would be included in Amazon Prime Video's Welcome to the Blumhouse horror film anthology. It was released in the anthology's first installment on October 6, 2020.

Personal life
Enos married actor Alan Ruck on January 4, 2008. They have two children, and two stepchildren from Ruck's previous marriage. She was raised in the Church of Jesus Christ of Latter-day Saints but is no longer a practicing member.

Filmography

Film

Television

Stage

Video games

Awards and nominations

References

External links
 
 
 
 
 

1975 births
20th-century American actresses
21st-century American actresses
Actresses from Texas
Former Latter Day Saints
American people of French descent
American people of Scottish descent
American stage actresses
American television actresses
Brigham Young University alumni
Living people
Actresses from Houston
Actresses from Kansas City, Missouri